The following is the final results of the Iran Division One 1996/1997 basketball season.

Participated teams

ABFA Shiraz
Fajr Gorgan
Fath Tehran
Foolad Mobarakeh Isfahan
Gach Khorasan
Mersad Shiraz
Moghavemat Basij Shahrekord
Paykan Tehran
Rah Ahan Tehran
Saina Kordestan
Sepidrood Rasht
Tarbiat Badani Babol
Zob Ahan Isfahan
Zoghalsang Kerman

Final standing
Zob Ahan Isfahan
Paykan Tehran
Rah Ahan Tehran

External links
 Asia-Basket
 iranbasketball.org

Iranian Basketball Super League seasons
League
Iran